Aurelius Dwight Parker (April 23, 1802 – June 18, 1875) was an American politician.

Parker was born in Princeton, Mass, April 23, 1802, the son of Ebenezer and Mary (Binney) Parker.  He graduated from Yale College in 1826.  He began the study of law in the Litchfield Law School, and completed his preparation for admission to the bar in the office of the Hon. Samuel Hubbard, of Boston, Mass. In 1830 he began the practice of law in that city, and though owing to some bodily infirmities he seldom appeared in the court room, was much employed as a chamber counsellor, and much trusted in drafting important papers. He was for many years a member of the city school committee, and repeatedly elected to the Massachusetts House of Representatives.  He died in Boston, June 18, 1875, after an illness of some four months, occasioned by a cancer of the throat. He was never married.

External links
 Litchfield Ledger

1802 births
1875 deaths
People from Princeton, Massachusetts
Yale College alumni
Litchfield Law School alumni
Massachusetts lawyers
Members of the Massachusetts House of Representatives
19th-century American politicians
19th-century American lawyers